Carosi is an Italian surname. Notable people with the surname include:

Aldo Carosi (born 1951), Italian judge
Angelo Carosi (born 1964), Italian long-distance runner
Manuela Carosi (born 1965), Italian swimmer

Italian-language surnames